The mountains of Mac. Robertson Land are located in the region Mac. Robertson Land, East Antarctica, between 60° E and 73° E. This region is claimed by Australia as part of the Australian Antarctic Territory. The area is highly glaciated. The availability of reliable data for this region is limited, making the list incomplete and inaccurate. The highest peaks, including nunataks and ice domes, are listed below:

See also 
List of mountains of East Antarctica
Komsomol'skiy Peak
Neill Peak
Stump Mountain

References 

 
Mac. Robertson Land
Mountains of Mac. Robertson Land, List